"On Fire" is a song by Swiss recording artist Stefanie Heinzmann. It was written by Joachim Persson, Audra Mae, Johan Carl Axel Alkenäs, and Niclas Molinder for her fourth studio album Chance of Rain (2015), while production was helmed by Henrik Barman Michelsen
and Edvard Førre Erfjord under their production moniker Electric. The song was released as the album's second single in July 2015 and reached the top forty of the Swiss Singles Chart.

Charts

Weekly charts

References

External links
  
 

2015 singles
2015 songs
Stefanie Heinzmann songs
Songs written by Joacim Persson
Songs written by Audra Mae
Songs written by Niclas Molinder
Universal Music Group singles